Bang Hyo-mun (born 8 September 1965) is a South Korean weightlifter. He competed in the men's flyweight event at the 1984 Summer Olympics.

References

1965 births
Living people
South Korean male weightlifters
Olympic weightlifters of South Korea
Weightlifters at the 1984 Summer Olympics
Place of birth missing (living people)
20th-century South Korean people